Gordon Wallace (born 6 January 1955) is a retired Scottish-Canadian soccer player who played professional in the North American Soccer League and earned nine caps with the Canadian men's national soccer team.

National team
A forward, Wallace started in three games for Canada in the fall of 1973 in a friendlies away against Luxembourg and twice against Haiti.  He played three more times in 1974 in friendlies played away against Bermuda, East Germany, and as a substitute against Poland.  He did not play again until 1980 when he started in New Zealand, and came on as a substitute against Honduras and Guatemala.  In his nine appearances he did not score any goals.

Professional
Wallace played club soccer in the NASL for the Montreal Olympique in 1973, Toronto Metros in 1974, and the Toronto Blizzard in the summers of 1980 and 81.  He also played for the Montreal Castors of the National Soccer League. In 1982, he returned to the National Soccer League to play with Hamilton Steelers where he assisted in securing the NSL Championship.

Son William Wallace soon to be Graduate of IT Tralee, Ireland.

References

External links
 
 NASL stats

1955 births
Living people
Canada men's international soccer players
Canadian soccer players
North American Soccer League (1968–1984) players
Montreal Olympique players
Toronto Blizzard (1971–1984) players
Montreal Castors players
Footballers from Glasgow
Scottish emigrants to Canada
Association football forwards
Canadian National Soccer League players
Hamilton Steelers (1981–1992) players